Enterprise is the cross-border inter-city train service between  in the Republic of Ireland and  in Northern Ireland, jointly operated by Iarnród Éireann (IE) and NI Railways (NIR). It operates on the Belfast–Dublin railway line.

History
The Great Northern Railway (Ireland)  (GNR(I)) introduced the service as the "Enterprise Express" on Monday 11 August 1947 in an attempt to compete with air and road transport which were challenging the railways. In particular, business travel was and is an important market. Customs checks were limited to the Belfast and Dublin terminals to reduce journey times by ensuring that journeys were non-stop, and advance booking was available. The name of the train comes from the "enterprising" approach that the GNR(I) took to make journeys more convenient for passengers despite the requirement for customs checks. Locomotives of GNRI Class V were initially used, followed in 1948 by GNRI Class VS.

In October 1950 the service was extended to Glanmire Road station (renamed to Cork Kent in 1966) in Cork. This proved unsuccessful and ceased in September 1953 when the governments of the Republic of Ireland and Northern Ireland nationalised the GNR as the Great Northern Railway Board (GNRB). The Cork service's unpopularity may also have been due to the six-and-a-half-hour journey time.

On 1 October 1958 the GNRB was dissolved and its assets and liabilities were split between Córas Iompair Éireann (CIÉ) and the Ulster Transport Authority (UTA) — the predecessors of Iarnród Éireann (IÉ) and Northern Ireland Railways (NIR) respectively. Following the completion of the Belfast Central Line Project, which involved the relaying of track along the route of the former Belfast Central Railway, the Belfast terminal moved to the newly constructed Belfast Central station in April 1976. The new station was named after the former railway and was located some distance from Belfast City Centre, adjacent to the city's markets.

The service was upgraded in September 1997 with a new timetable and new coaching stock from French train makers De Dietrich Ferroviaire (now Alstom DDF). At this point the service, which had operated under either the IÉ or NIR brands, was branded separately as Enterprise.

The service has suffered disruption, particularly during the Troubles when it was regularly halted by bomb threats. These became so frequent and caused such considerable disruption to the service that a campaigning group, the Peace Train Organisation was formed in 1989. Since the Northern Ireland peace process however, such disruption has diminished. Renewed investment in recent years has seen the line upgraded to continuously welded track capable of  running along the southern part of the route, as part of Iarnród Éireann's rail network upgrades. The Northern Ireland section of the line was also upgraded to 90 mph running on many sections of the line.

Journey times vary between 2 hours 5 minutes (with four intermediate stops) and 2 hours 20 minutes (with six intermediate stops), with an average speed of  respectively.

The Railway Preservation Society of Ireland runs a steam Enterprise in the summer months to exchange its Dublin-based engine with its Whitehead-based engine.

Autumn 2009 disruption
On Friday 21 August 2009  of the Broadmeadow estuary viaduct, north of Malahide, collapsed, causing serious disruptions to Enterprise services. During the disruption the Enterprise operated between Belfast Central and Drogheda, with buses connecting Drogheda with Dublin Connolly. The line reopened on Monday 16 November with full services resumed.

Mid-life refurbishment
The Enterprise underwent a face-lift during 2009, with the carriages being resprayed in silver with green livery, some of which could be seen at Translink's York Road Maintenance Depot.

In 2014, a mid-life refurbishment programme was announced for the Enterprise service. Rotating refurbishment involved substituting non-Enterprise trainsets on an individual basis which began in November 2014 with 5-car IE 22000 Class Trains Numbered 22036-22039 working the 07:35,10:35,13:20,16:05,19:00 and 21:35 (retimed 21:15 in June 2015) with a return to service of the first revamped coaches in November 2015. Refurbishment provided new mechanical running gear, in coach electronics and modernised interiors. The first refurbished set, consisting of DVT 9002 and Locomotive 206, operated a trial service from York Road Depot in Belfast to Dublin Connolly and back, on Thursday 15 October 2015 departing York Road at 10:27 and departing Dublin at 13:05. The same set operated its first official passenger service after its refurbishment on Monday 16 November 2015 working the 08:00 Belfast Central (Now Lanyon Place) To Dublin Connolly. The first set: 9002 Entered Service on Monday 16 November 2015, 9001 then entered service on 5 February 2016, working the 18:05 Belfast Central to Dublin Connolly, 9003 entered service on 1 April 2016 working the 08:00 Belfast to Dublin, And 9004 entered service on 20 June 2016, By the time the first 3 DD Sets were in service, The refurbishment was officially completed on Sunday 10 April 2016, to coincide with the introduction of an enhanced Enterprise timetable. From Sunday 10 April 2016, The following changes occurred: 06:50 Belfast to Dublin was retimed 06:45. 09:35 Dublin to Belfast was retimed 09:30. 11:00 Dublin to Belfast was retimed 11:20. Also from Monday 11 April 2016 onwards, the 21:15 Belfast to Dublin was withdrawn and replaced by the 20:05 Belfast to Dublin.

Services
Passengers can travel "First Plus" or "Enterprise Class". Additional to a trolley service there is a "Café Bar" serving alcohol, soft drinks, tea & coffee and hot and cold snacks.  The seating in the Cafe Bar is the same as the other rail seats, with the same tables.

First Plus comes with more leg room, reclining seats, tinted windows with blinds, complimentary newspapers (on most services the two main Belfast papers but on occasion the Irish Independent and Irish Times are available).
Food is available for purchase in First Plus with a full three-course menu serving breakfast (before 12pm), lunch and dinner (after 12pm). Tea and Coffee from this menu come with complementary refills. First Plus is also significantly quieter as it is rare for either First Plus carriage to be full to capacity. A member of the train crew checks passengers tickets at the door to the First Plus carriages, since many people are unaware there are two classes of carriage on the train.

Both classes have air conditioning vents designed into the rim of the window frames and free WiFi supplied by NI Railways.  The WiFi is limited to 150MB of data each day per device.  A glass display is atop the door of every carriage showing an analogue clock face with the current time, the destination station, the next station, and any other information may be scrolled down the bottom of the display.  Approximately 3 minutes from every stop the computer will announce "we are now approaching (station name)" to give passengers enough time to gather their belongings before disembarking. Since the Enterprise brand aims to be politically neutral, there are no Irish Rail or NI Railways logos inside or outside the train (with the exception of the alcohol consumption policy poster, which includes the logos of both operators), only Enterprise specific branding, all announcements are made only in English and not in Irish, and all items available for purchase are dual priced in Pounds Sterling as well as in Euros (exchange rate of €1.30-€1.40 per £1 depending on product regardless of actual exchange rate). Payments made by card are charged in Pounds Sterling. Both classes include dedicated areas for wheelchair users.

Rolling stock

Current fleet

Each push-pull trainset consists of seven coaches and a 201 Class locomotive. The 28 carriages were delivered as four sets of seven but entered service as three sets of eight, with two locomotives from each operator. The coaches were manufactured by De Dietrich Ferroviaire, while the locomotives are from GM-EMD; ownership of the rolling stock is shared between both operators, with carriage maintenance by NIR and locomotives maintained by IE. The coaching stock is based on the Class 373 EMU stock used by Eurostar, with the interiors identical. The EMU stock is articulated and permanently coupled, but the Enterprise is ordinary coaching stock.

The service had suffered from a lack of reliability of the locomotives, which provide head end power to the train. Unlike IÉ's Dublin-Cork services, which operate with the locomotive operating with a generator control car that provides power for lighting and heating the train, the Enterprise fleet was only equipped with an ordinary control car, which had no power generating capability. This meant that the locomotive had to provide all the power for the train, both motive and generating. Extended operation in this mode caused damage, so four further locomotives were allocated to Enterprise from the IÉ fleet. However, this still required locomotives to be used in HEP mode, so in May 2009 the Minister for Regional Development in Northern Ireland requested an estimate for the provision of generator functions for the existing rolling stock so that head-end power mode would no longer be needed.

In order to avoid further problems, a modified Mark 3 Generator van, formerly 7604, was introduced on Monday 10 September 2012. Three further such generator vans have since entered service.

If an Enterprise set is unavailable, either a NIR or an IÉ set can be used.  Both NIR and IÉ have equipped six each of their newest DMUs (3000 and 29000) and ten 22000 Class DMUs to each other's specifications so they may be used in the event of a breakdown.

Formation

The formation of the train is: DVT with First Plus, First Plus, buffet carriage, four standard carriages, a Mark 3 Generator Van and a 201 Class locomotive, with the locomotive at the Belfast end and the control car at the Dublin end.

Driving Van Trailer First
All trains have a driving trailer, numbered 9001–9004, containing a driving cab, a luggage area and 29 First Plus seats. It weighs 42 tonnes and has a wheelchair space. The cab is only used for services from Belfast, as the locomotive goes north.

Trailer First Plus
The second carriage in the Enterprise train set, numbered 9101–9104, is an additional First Plus coach with 47 seats (no wheelchair space or luggage area). It weighs 40 tonnes.

Trailer Buffet
Next coach, numbered 9401–9404 is a buffet coach.

Trailer Standard Disabled Space
Coach four, numbered 9213–9216, is standard class with a wheelchair space.

Trailer Standard
Coaches five to seven, numbered 9201–9212, are standard class (no wheelchair space).

Trailer Generator Van
Since 2012 electric power for the train is no longer delivered from the locomotive but from a separate generator van. Their final numbers are 9602, 9604, 9606 and 9608.

Future fleet
Both IÉ and NIR have an ambition to introduce hourly services, but it would be necessary to procure new, faster rolling stock to achieve the required improvements in frequency and speed. In 2005, they investigated procuring new rolling stock when seven  capable Class 222 DEMUs built for the British network became available as one of the possible options, which also included the procurement of additional 22000 Class DMUs as part of IÉ's order. New rolling stock would most likely be a multiple unit rather than locomotive-hauled, similar to IÉ's plans for Dublin-Cork services.

Future developments
Press reports from 2007 have stated that NIR & IÉ plan to introduce a new hourly service. This was reiterated in a statement by Conor Murphy, the then Northern Ireland Minister for Regional Development, who stated that the two companies had made a presentation to the North/South Ministerial Council in October 2007 putting forward the case for improvements in the frequency and speed of the service.

Any improvements to the service would require significant investment in track and signalling, as well as new rolling stock. In April 2008, the then Minister for Regional Development stated that the major improvements to the infrastructure and rolling stock required by Enterprise would be in the region of £500 million. However, the introduction of an hourly timetable remains an ambition for NIR and IÉ.

The line south of the border was upgraded to continuous welded rail in the 1990s, while NIR has also made track improvements to allow an increase in speed. Enterprise would require a minimum of seven trains to operate an hourly service – until 2013, IÉ had a significant number of stored Mark 3 rolling stock available, of which five sets were push-pull capable.

However, all of IÉ's Mark 3 carriages were scrapped during 2013 and 2014. NIR also withdrew its "Gatwick" set in June 2009 and it has been preserved by the RPSI. The introduction of the 22000 Class could potentially be used to enhance the frequency of the Enterprise which has led to a surplus of locomotives that could be utilised.

Criticism
In November 2007 the cross-border IBEC-CBI Joint Business Council, in a submission to the North/South Ministerial Council, stated that Enterprise was falling behind compared to the improvements of other international rail providers, with delays "often up to an hour" and serious reliability problems and an uncompetitive journey time against making the journey by road.

With the faster road journey to Dublin and the Enterprise's unreliability and infrequency, it has faced a loss of revenue as passengers switch to much cheaper and faster alternatives.

Gallery

References

External links

 "Iarnród Éireann" page on the Enterprise
 "Translink/Northern Ireland Railways" page on the Enterprise
 

International named passenger trains
Named passenger trains of the United Kingdom
Named passenger trains of Ireland
Great Northern Railway (Ireland)
Railway services introduced in 1947